Tomáš Marček (born 10 March 1987) is a Slovak retired football midfielder who last played for the Slovak Corgoň Liga club Spartak Myjava.

External links
AS Trenčín profile

References

1987 births
Living people
Slovak footballers
Association football midfielders
AS Trenčín players
Spartak Myjava players
Slovak Super Liga players
Sportspeople from Trenčín